George Edward Hesselbacher (January 18, 1895 - February 18, 1980)  was a Major League Baseball pitcher who pitched for the Philadelphia Athletics. He was born on January 18, 1895, in Philadelphia, Pennsylvania. He was 6'2" tall and weighed 175 pounds. He threw and batted right-handed.

 He walked 22, struck out six and had an ERA of 7.27. He played his final game on July 19, 1916.

On February 18, 1980, Hesselbacher died in Rydal, Pennsylvania, and was buried in Northwood Cemetery in Philadelphia.

Other information
Hesselbacher served as a commanding officer in the United States Army during World War I.

References

External links

1895 births
1980 deaths
Major League Baseball pitchers
Philadelphia Athletics players
Baseball players from Pennsylvania
United States Army personnel of World War I
United States Army officers
Penn State Nittany Lions baseball players
Sportspeople from Philadelphia
Burials at Northwood Cemetery, Philadelphia